James Cole (born 16 August 1988) is a British racing driver from Southport, Merseyside. He made his British Touring Car Championship debut in 2013.

Career

Formula Ford
Cole began his racing career in 2007, taking part in BRSCC North West Formula Ford. He won this regional championship, and in 2008 moved to the main British Formula Ford Championship. He finished tenth. He continued another year in the series, and won the 2009 championship, taking seven wins and fifteen podiums in the twenty-four races.

He was nominated for the 2009 McLaren Autosport BRDC Award.

British Formula 3
He changed series to the British Formula 3 National Class for the 2010 season, driving for T-Sport alongside Alex Brundle and Menasheh Idafar. He finished second in the class.

Formula Two
He moved to Formula Two for the start of the 2011 season with British Formula 3 teammate Brundle.

British Touring Car Championship

Tony Gilham Racing (2013)

After a year out of racing, Cole joined Team HARD. for the 2013 British Touring Car Championship season to drive an NGTC Vauxhall Insignia. He was allowed to drive the car for the first time on the Friday before the Brands Hatch round to shake down the car. In July 2013, Cole announced he had left Team HARD. to focus on securing a drive for 2014.

United Autosports (2014–)
For the 2014 British Touring Car Championship season, Cole joined United Autosports who will be making their debut in the series.

Racing record

Career summary

† As Cole was a guest driver, he was ineligible to score points.

Complete FIA Formula Two Championship results
(key)

Complete British Touring Car Championship results
(key) (Races in bold indicate pole position – 1 point awarded just in first race; races in italics indicate fastest lap – 1 point awarded all races; * signifies that driver lead race for at least one lap – 1 point given all races)

References

External links 
 
 James Cole driver page at formulatwo.com 

1988 births
Living people
English racing drivers
FIA Formula Two Championship drivers
British Formula Three Championship drivers
British Touring Car Championship drivers
T-Sport drivers
United Autosports drivers